Colossus, Colossos, or the plural Colossi or Colossuses, may refer to:

Statues
 Any exceptionally large statue
 List of tallest statues
 :Category:Colossal statues
 Colossus of Barletta, a bronze statue of an unidentified Roman emperor
 Colossus of Constantine, a bronze and marble statue of the Roman emperor Constantine the Great
 Colossi of Memnon, two stone statues of Pharaoh Amenhotep III
 Colossus of Nero, a bronze statue of the Roman emperor Nero
 Colossus of Rhodes, a bronze statue of the Greek god Helios
 Colossus of Apollonia Pontica, a bronze  statue of the Greek god Apollo at the harbor of the ancient Greek city of Apollonia Pontica, created by Calamis
 Apennine Colossus, a stone statue created as a personification of the Apennine mountains

Amusement rides
 Colossus (Ferris wheel), Ferris wheel at Six Flags St. Louis, Missouri, US
 Colossus, a pirate ship at Robin Hill theme park, Isle of Wight, UK

Roller coasters
 Colossos (Heide Park), in Lower Saxony, Germany
 Colossus (Six Flags Magic Mountain), in California, US
 Colossus (Thorpe Park), in Surrey, UK
 Colossus the Fire Dragon, at Lagoon amusement park, Utah, US

Art, entertainment, and media

Fictional entities
 Colossus (comics), a fictional character in the X-Men series
 Colossi, the eponymous enemies in Shadow of the Colossus
 GTVA Colossus, a spacefaring warship in FreeSpace 2

Film
 Colossus: The Forbin Project (1970), a film based on the D. F. Jones novel

Games
 Colossus Chess, a series of chess-playing programs

Literature
 Colossus (collection), short stories by Donald Wandrei
 Colossus (novel), by D. F. Jones

Music
 Colossus Records, an American label
 Colossus (band), an American Christian metal band from Sioux Falls, South Dakota

Albums
 Colossus (Scorn album), 1993
 Colossus (Walt Mink album), 1997
 Colossus, by Triggerfinger, 2017
 Colossus (EP), by Caligula's Horse, 2011

Songs
 "Colossus", by Afro Celt Sound System from Volume 3: Further in Time
 "Colossus", by Borknagar from Quintessence
 "Colossus", by Lightning Bolt from Earthly Delights
 "Colossus", by Tyler, the Creator from Wolf
 "Colossus", by In Mourning from The Weight of Oceans, 2012
 "Colossus", by Idles from Joy as an Act of Resistance
 "Colossus", by Caligula's Horse from Colossus, 2011
 "Colossus", by Thomas Bangalter from Trax On Da Rocks Vol.2, 1998

Computing
 Colossus computer, the first programmable electronic digital computer, used for code breaking in World War II
 Colossus, the codename for a new version of the Google File System

Warships
 Colossus class (disambiguation) (UK)
 French ship Colosse
 HMS Colossus (UK)
 USS Colossus (US)

Other uses
 Colossus Cinemas, a Canadian movie theater brand
 Colossus, a reticulated python once considered the largest snake in captivity

See also
 The Colossus (disambiguation)
 Colossus Bridge (disambiguation)
 Colossae, an ancient city of Phrygia
 Colossal (disambiguation)
 Colosseum (disambiguation)
 Kolossus (disambiguation)